Edward James Blake (December 23, 1925 – April 15, 2009) was an American right-handed pitcher in Major League Baseball who played four seasons with the Cincinnati Reds and the Kansas City Athletics. In eight career games, Blake pitched 8⅔ innings and had an 8.31 earned run average (ERA).

After graduating high school in East St. Louis, Blake played in the farm system of the nearby St. Louis Cardinals before enlisting in the army. He returned to baseball after being wounded in the military service, pitching in the minors for five years before making his major league debut for the Cincinnati Reds. He pitched for them on and off for three years, then spent the next six years pitching for the Toronto Maple Leafs. His last major league appearance was a stint with the Athletics in 1957, and two years later his professional baseball career ended. After retirement he became a plumber, and died in 2009.

Early life
Born in St. Louis, Missouri to Edward and Katherine Blake, he attended Central Catholic High School in East St. Louis, where he was a baseball teammate of Hank Bauer, and graduated in 1943. Blake pitched batting practice for the St. Louis Cardinals during the 1943 World Series after his high school graduation, in what he considered to be the highlight of his professional career. He signed with the Cardinals in 1944 and spent the season with three different minor league teams: the Columbus Red Birds of the American Association, the Allentown Cardinals of the Interstate League and the Mobile Bears of the Southern Association.

Military service and 1940s career
After the 1944 season ended, Blake enlisted in the Army and fought with the 40th Infantry Division in the Pacific Theater of Operations. While in the Philippines, Blake was wounded, and was out of action for nine months as he recovered. As the 1946 season began, he rejoined the Cardinals, now fully recovered, and spent the season with the Columbus Cardinals. Blake started the season losing his first three starts, but then won 13 straight and finished the season with a 16 wins, eight losses, and a 3.51 earned run average. In February 1947, Blake was among a group of 92 Cardinals players invited to a dinner for Cardinals minor leaguers, where accusations in regards to Cardinals players being paid poorly were brought up and discussed. He spent the following season playing for both Columbus teams, playing 29 games in total and finishing the season with a combined 4.46 ERA. Before the 1948 season began, Blake was promoted to the Rochester Red Wings of the International League. He had a 7–6 record and a 3.88 ERA in 34 games, seven of them starts. In 1949, Blake spent most of the season playing for Rochester. On August 9, 1949, he was traded by the Cardinals to the Cincinnati Reds in exchange for Mike Schultz, ending his career with the Cardinals. Blake finished the season with the Syracuse Chiefs and finished the season with a combined 5–4 record and a 4.78 ERA.

Minor leagues and Reds career
Blake began the 1950 season with Syracuse Chiefs and spent most of the season as a starting pitcher instead of a reliever. He started in 23 games and finished the season with a 12–8 record and an ERA of 3.51. In 1951, Blake was considered to have a small chance to make the major league roster. Nonetheless, Blake got his first taste of the major leagues that season. He made his major league debut on May 1, 1951, against the Philadelphia Phillies. Blake played three games during his time on the Reds in 1951, and finished two of those games. He pitched four innings, allowing five runs and three home runs, finishing the season with an ERA of 11.25. While on the Reds in 1951, he was part of a Reds "bullpen union" led by Jim Blackburn, which drew up a series of humorous requests including a smoking lounge and sandwiches between double headers. He spent most of the 1951 season with the Columbus Red Birds, playing in 27 games for them. In 27 pitching appearances, 23 of them starts, Blake went 7–15 with a 5.91 ERA. Despite the record, Blake led the Red Birds in innings pitched and finished tied for second in wins, though he did also lead the team, which went 53–101, in losses.

Blake spent most of 1952 with the Milwaukee Brewers of the American Association, but he also pitched a few games for the Reds during the 1952 Cincinnati Reds season. He pitched in two games for the Reds in 1952, coming in to finish both games for the Reds. He pitched three shutout innings, allowing three hits in these two games. During his time with the Brewers, he pitched in 21 games. He started 19 of the 21 games, won ten and lost three, and had a 3.96 ERA. As the 1953 season began, Blake again had a stint with Cincinnati, but spent most of the season with the Indianapolis Indians. He pitched in one game for the Reds on April 17, 1953, against the Milwaukee Brewers, allowing two earned runs on a hit and a walk without getting a batter out. During his time with the Indianapolis Indians, he pitched in 29 games, and was the workhorse of the Indians' squad. He finished the season with a 14–7 record, a 3.76 ERA, and 208 innings pitched, and led the team in wins, innings pitched, and starting appearances.

Maple Leafs and Athletics career
The 1953 season marked Blake's last appearance with the Reds. On February 1, 1954, Blake was purchased from the Reds by the Toronto Maple Leafs, an unaffiliated team of the American Association. He played for the Maple Leafs for a total of six seasons, where he had some of his best professional career seasons. In 1954, he teamed with Connie Johnson to lead the Maple Leafs to a 97–57 record. He finished the 1954 season with a 15–9 record, a 3.92 ERA, 30 games started, and 209 innings pitched, leading the team in the latter two categories. The following season, he combined with Johnson and Jack Crimian to help Toronto win 94 games. On July 10, Blake was the first pitcher in the International League to win 13 games when he beat the Columbus squad 7–4. He finished the season with 17 wins, 13 losses, and a 3.94 ERA. In 1956, Blake was a member of the "big three" for the Maple Leafs, along with Don Johnson and International League Most Valuable Player Lynn Lovenguth. The three combined for 750 innings pitched and 57 complete games while often working on two days' rest. He finished the season with 17 wins, 11 losses, and a 2.61 ERA. He also led the team in shutouts with six.

Blake was drafted at the end of the 1956 season by the Kansas City Athletics in the rule 5 draft. The day after being drafted, the Athletics planned to include him in an eight-player deal with the Detroit Tigers involving Virgil Trucks and others, but his inclusion in the trade was vetoed by Commissioner Ford Frick, claiming his inclusion was "against the spirit of the draft." Blake was replaced in the trade by former Toronto teammate Jack Crimian. While he spent most of the 1957 season with Toronto, he had one final major league stint with the Athletics, pitching in two games in April. His 1957 stint in Toronto was not as successful as previous seasons, as he finished with eight wins, nine losses, and a 5.54 ERA. He spent five weeks of the 1958 season unable to play due to injury. Despite this, he was still able to pitch in 23 games, winning nine and bringing his ERA down to 3.54. In 1959, Blake split time between Toronto and the Houston Buffs, winning three games and losing ten in his final professional season of baseball.

Personal and later life
After his playing career ended, Blake went on to become a plumber. He spent nearly 50 years in the plumbing business and was formerly the president of Plumbers Local 360. Blake was married to his wife, Carol Jean, for 47 years before her death. With Carol, he had a son, Ed, and a daughter, Peggy. His son, also named Ed Blake, was a former pitcher who played in the Baltimore Orioles' farm system from 1970 to 1973, playing for the AA affiliate Asheville Orioles at the peak of his career. Blake died in Swansea, Illinois at the age of 83 after a long illness, and is interred at Mount Carmel Cemetery in Belleville, Illinois.

References

External links

1925 births
2009 deaths
Cincinnati Reds players
Kansas City Athletics players
Syracuse Chiefs players
Indianapolis Indians players
Toronto Maple Leafs (International League) players
Major League Baseball pitchers
Baseball players from St. Louis